Zadran may refer to:

People
 Zadran (Pashtun tribe)
 Shapoor Zadran, Afghan cricket player
 Noor Zadran, Afghan footballer
 Noor Ali Zadran, Afghan cricket player
 Dawlat Zadran, Afghan cricket player

Other
 Wuza Zadran District, Afghanistan